Jiří Procházka (born June 25, 1980 in Vyškov) is a Czech ice dancer. He is the 2005 Czech champion with Diana Janošťáková, 2002 and 2003 champion with Veronika Morávková, and 1999 champion with Gabriela Hrázská.

Competitive highlights

With Janošťáková

With Morávková

With Hrázská

With Kuncová

References 
 
 

Czech male ice dancers
1980 births
Living people
People from Vyškov